Flauto can refer to:
 Recorder (musical instrument) if flauto dolce, flauto a becco or flauto diritto
 Flute if flauto traverso

cs:Flétna